Alfredo Demarchi (1857-1937) was an Argentine businessman and politician, who held various state positions, including as Vice Governor of the Province of Buenos Aires.

Biography 

He was born in Buenos Aires, the son of Antonio Demarchi and Mercedes Quiroga, daughter of Facundo Quiroga, belonging to a distinguished family of Swiss and Creole origin. He completed his elementary and university studies in Europe, and received an engineering degree from the Institute of Technology of Zurich around 1878.

He began his political career in 1894 when he was elected as a national deputy by the Radical Party. He served as Vice Governor between 1898 and 1902, and in 1918 was appointed to occupy the Head of the Ministry of Agriculture and Livestock of Argentina.

Family 

Alfredo Demarchi was married to Clara Leloir, daughter of Alejandro Leloir Sáenz Valiente and María del Tránsito Sáenz Valiente. He was the grandson of Facundo Quiroga, and his wife niece granddaughter of Juan Martín de Pueyrredón, prominent politicians and military of Argentina during the 19th century.

References 

1857 births
1937 deaths
Burials at La Recoleta Cemetery
Argentine engineers
Politicians from Buenos Aires
ETH Zurich alumni
Argentine expatriates in Switzerland
Argentine people of Swiss descent
Radical Civic Union politicians
Ministers of agriculture of Argentina
Argentine business executives
Members of the Argentine Chamber of Deputies elected in Buenos Aires Province
Vice Governors of Buenos Aires Province